Albert Malbert (1914–1972) was a French film actor.

Selected filmography
 The Crisis is Over (1934)
 Return to Paradise (1935)
 Bach the Detective (1936)
 Moutonnet (1936)
 The Brighton Twins (1936)
 Culprit (1937)
 Tricoche and Cacolet (1938)
 Crossroads (1938)
 Rasputin (1938)
 The Fatted Calf (1939)
 The Last of the Six (1941)
 Annette and the Blonde Woman (1942)
 Le Corbeau (1943)
 The Stairs Without End  (1943)
 Sowing the Wind (1944)
 Boule de suif (1945)
 The Lost Village (1947)
 Eternal Conflict (1948)
 The Farm of Seven Sins (1949)
 The Heroic Monsieur Boniface (1949)
 Cartouche, King of Paris (1950)

References

Bibliography
 Goble, Alan. The Complete Index to Literary Sources in Film. Walter de Gruyter, 1999.

External links

1914 births
1972 deaths
French male film actors
Male actors from Bordeaux